A besom is a broom, a household implement used for sweeping. The term is now mostly reserved for a traditional broom constructed from a bundle of twigs tied to a stout pole. The twigs used could be broom (i.e. Genista, from which comes the modern name "broom" for the tool), heather or similar. The song "Buy Broom Buzzems" from Northern England refers to both types of twig. From the phrase broom besom the more common broom comes. In Scotland, besoms are still occasionally to be found at the edge of forests where they are stacked for use in early response to an outbreak of fire.

Description
As a result of its construction around a central pole, the brush of the besom is rounded instead of flat. The bristles can be made of many materials including, but not limited to straw, herbs, or twigs. Traditionally the handle is of hazel wood and the head is of birch twigs. Modern construction uses bindings of wire and string (instead of the traditional split withy) and the head is secured by a steel nail instead of a wooden dowel.

Besoms and flying ointments in early modern witchcraft

A number of different recipes for "flying ointments" have survived from the Early modern period, some of the constituents of which not only have hallucinogenic properties but are fat-soluble and could have been absorbed transdermally. Certain researchers have speculated that the stereotypical image of the witch "flying" astride the broomstick of a besom may derive from traditions concerning the use of broomsticks or other staves by women to apply psychotropic ointments to their vaginal or anal mucosa. The active ingredients in Flying ointments were primarily plants in the nightshade family Solanaceae, most commonly Atropa belladonna (deadly nightshade) and Hyoscyamus niger (henbane), belonging to the tropane alkaloid-rich tribe Hyoscyameae. Other tropane-containing, nightshade ingredients included the famous Mandrake Mandragora officinarum, Scopolia carniolica and Datura stramonium, the Thornapple.
The alkaloids Atropine, Hyoscyamine and Scopolamine present in these Solanaceous plants are not only potent (and highly toxic) hallucinogens of the deliriant class, but are also fat-soluble and capable of being absorbed through unbroken human skin.
Another ingredient listed frequently in the various flying ointment recipes is the even more toxic Aconitum napellus, which has (among others) the English common name Wolfsbane (i.e. "slayer of wolves").

References

External links 

 

Magic items
European witchcraft
Wiccan terminology
Cleaning tools